Drung may refer to:

Derung people, an ethnic group of China
Derung language, spoken by the Derung people of China
Drung parish, a civil parish of Ireland